USNS Watson (T-AKR-310) is one of Military Sealift Command's nineteen Large, Medium-Speed Roll-on/Roll-off Ships and is part of the 33 ships in the Prepositioning Program. She is the lead ship of  her class of vehicle cargo ships.

She was named for Private George Watson, a Medal of Honor recipient.
 
Laid down on 23 May 1996 and launched on 26 July 1997, Watson was put into service in the Pacific Ocean on 23 June 1998.

Notable deployments

In November 2022, Watson took onboard part of an Army Prepositioned Stock and then went to Hawaii, there delivering more than 500 pieces of equipment, vehicles and containers, in support of its Operation Pathways exercise to be held in Australia in 2023. Unloading was done by soldiers of the 8th Theater Sustainment Command, 25th Infantry Division, 599th Transportation Brigade, and 402nd Army Field Support Brigade. It was the first time Watson had visited Hawaii. The equipment will be inspected to ensure they're not carrying any pollen, animals or other organisms or material that could threaten ecosystems in Australia, before moving there.

References

External links

 USNS Watson (T-AKR-310) at navsource.org
 USNS Watson (T-AKR 310) at navysite.de
 USNS Watson (T-AKR-310) Current Position NATO WARSHIP at marinevesseltraffic.com
 GT WATSON Naval/Naval Auxiliary, IMO 9112727 at vesselfinder.com

 

Watson-class vehicle cargo ships
Ships built in San Diego
1997 ships